Hans Andersson may refer to: 
===Hans===
 H. Johan Andersson (born 1984), Swedish ice hockey player for Växjö and Frölunda
 Hans Andersson-Tvilling (born 1928), Swedish football and ice hockey player for Djurgården
 Hans Andersson (footballer), Swedish footballer